Archibald Gardner (September 2, 1814 – February 8, 1902) was a 19th-century pioneer and businessman who, with his knowledge of lumber- and grist mills, helped establish communities in Alvinston, Ontario; West Jordan, Utah; and Star Valley, Wyoming. In his lifetime Archibald built 36 gristmills and lumber mills — 23 in Utah, 6 in Canada, 5 in Wyoming, and 2 in Idaho — greatly benefiting the lives of those in the surrounding areas. Archibald also built hundreds of miles of canals to introduce the flow of water to the mills' apparatus.

Archibald was known as a businessman, father, practical engineer, millwright, polygamist, husband, and Bishop. In March 1859 he was called as a local leader in the Church of Jesus Christ of Latter-day Saints (LDS Church) lasting for the next 32 years.

Early life
Archibald was born on September 2, 1814, in Kilsyth, Scotland. His father, Robert Gardner, operated Black Bull Inn Tavern and rented Gamill Mill where Archibald was born. Robert Gardner with his wife Margaret Calinder had nine children, five of which survived — William, Mary, Janet, Archibald, and Robert. During the unrest in Scotland, Robert Gardner was thought to be a rebel and thrown in prison. He was later released when no traitorous evidence could be found. Wanting nothing to do with the up rise, Robert Gardner immigrated to Upper Canada (near Port Dalhousie) in 1822 with children William and Mary; the next year the rest of the family joined him. At age 17, Archibald built his first mill by following the direction of his father. Six years later Archibald went on his own, moving to Brooke, Kent County, Western District, Canada (later named Alvinston).
In Alvinston, Ontario, he built a gristmill in 1837 on the east end of the sixth concession of Brooke township. As was common to the technology of the period, Archibald Gardner's gristmills were "built without nails. Wooden pins and mortises were used instead. All shafts, bearings, cog wheels, etc. were of wood..." Gristmills often formed the economic center of a community, producing flour to bake bread. The gristmill area was on a hill that faces Alvinston. The area was called Gardner's Mill for several years. Archibald also built a saw mill in this area to produce shingles.

On February 18, 1839, Archibald Gardner married Margaret Livingston in Brooke. Archibald Gardner was baptized into the Church of Jesus Christ of Latter Day Saints in April 1845. Under business pressure and persecution, based on his joining the LDS Church, Gardner sold his Alvinston area mills at a reduced price and sent his family to America. Archibald fled Canada in 1846 after his affairs were in order. He was chased by the local sheriff and posse and forced to cross a dangerous river, St. Clair River by Lake Huron. Knowing his fate if he stayed in Canada, Archibald crossed the cold, icy river resulting in a miraculous escape to the United States.

Mormon Pioneer
In St. Louis, Missouri, Archibald met up with his family then traveled to Nauvoo, Illinois, only to find the LDS Saints driven out. After replenishing their packs the Gardner family headed to Winter Quarters where Archibald's daughter Janet died (October 10, 1846). Two years before on the same day Archibald's son also named Archibald died of the same illness at the same age.
	
In June 1847 the family started their trek to the Rocky Mountains in Bishop Hunter's Company arriving October 1, 1847. John Taylor, at the time a member of the Quorum of the Twelve Apostles also traveled in Archibald's company.

Life in the West

Mills and canals
After a season in Warm Springs with a failed attempt to build a sawmill, Archibald moved to Millcreek. In 1848 the family moved the mill to a site on Mill Creek where the water flow was greater, in time for the fall harvest. There the family claimed to have sawed the first lumber in the Salt Lake Valley.

Archibald Gardner and his brother Robert planned and began digging a two-and-a-half-mile millrace in West Jordan to provide water power for their Mills. The canal started at Jordan river extending into what is now Taylorsville.
The west side of Salt Lake Valley had little water flow forcing settlers to build irrigation systems to grow food.
West Jordan business boomed with the building of its first gristmill completed in 1858, the year before Archibald became bishop of the West Jordan ward. "Gardner Mill inspired a cluster of small industries, including blacksmith shops, logging and hauling operations, woolen and carding mills, a tannery, several stores, a shoe shop, and later a broom factory". In total Archibald, partnering with many others, built 23 mills in Utah, with several of the mills selling its products to Camp Floyd and Fort Douglas.

The Salt Lake Temple
The Latter-day Saint Salt Lake Temple foundation was laid in 1855. However, cracks and defects in the foundation put the plans to a halt. The President of the Latter-day Saints, Brigham Young and his advisers knew the foundation wouldn't sustain the weight of the temple. President Young seeking revelation said "Here I shall remain until the Lord reveals to me what I should do next", spotting Archibald, Brigham said "Bishop, sit down" telling Archibald of the issue and asking him what could be done. After listening Archibald calmly explained, "the trouble has arisen through the use of too much mortar. This time instead of using mortar, have each and all of the stones in the entire building cut to exact measurement and place stone upon stone with precise fittings. This will prevent cracking, settling or spreading in any way". To this President Brigham Young exclaimed, "Brother Gardner, you are right. That is my revelation". To this day, almost 150 years later, the Salt Lake City, LDS temple still stands. Clarence Gardner, son of Archibald Gardner believes this was a revelation from God, "Because he [Archibald] had spent his life working out problems along practical lines. His past experiences made him equal to the occasion."

Mining business
In 1863 Archibald Gardner unexpectedly became part of the mining business. While logging for Archibald Gardner, George B. Ogilvie discovered an "attractive piece of ore". He sent it off to General Patrick Edward Connor at Fort Douglas, the ore was discovered to have traces of silver. Claimants held a meeting and organized the Jordan Silver Mining District on September 17, 1863. Each individual (including Archibald Gardner and Patrick Edward Connor) was given one share except for George B. Ogilvie who was given two shares as the discoverer. Archibald Gardner was elected the first recorder for the district. The Jordan Silver Mining District eventually became the West Mountain Mining District. Today it is known as the Bingham Copper Mine owned by Kennecott.

As a polygamist
Archibald became a polygamist in 1849 by the requests of Brigham Young. His first wife Margaret Livingston intended to divorce him, believing that polygamy was a sinful act until Brigham Young spoke with her. The last of Archibald's 11 wives was illegal, taking place after the 1862 Morrill Anti-Bigamy Act. Due to an unsettled polygamist status after 1882, Archibald was chased by federal agents enforcing anti-polygamy laws. In 1886 he made a trip to California to visit his brother William. On his last trip evading federal agents, Archibald visited Mexico, and his brother Robert in southern Utah. In 1889 Archibald established a home in Afton, Wyoming (Star Valley). In Star Valley he built additional mills and lived near and with two wives, Laura Althea Thompson, his fifth wife, and Mary Larson, his 11th wife, and near or with several of his 48 children. When Althea died in Afton in 1899, Archibald buried her in the Salt Lake cemetery's Gardner family plot. Archibald stayed on in Utah building another gristmill in Spanish Fork. At 86, Archibald Gardner was taken to St. Mark's Hospital for an operation on a strangulated hernia. After the operation he was heard to say, "Here I go to solve the great mystery". Archibald Gardner died in the early morning of February 8, 1902, and is buried in the Salt Lake City Cemetery.

Wives of Archibald Gardner
From Life of Archibald Gardner: Utah Pioneer of 1847

Margaret Livingston (1818-1893)
Abigail Sprague Bradford (1813-1879)
Mary Ann Bradford (1831-1867)
Laura Althea Thompson (1834-1899)
Elizabeth Lewis Raglin (1832-1879)
Sarah Jane Park (1834-1916)
Serena Gahrsen Evensen (1822-1911)
Harriet Armitage Larter (1830-1866)
Elizabeth Dowding (1850-1921)
Mary Larsen (1850-1921)
Sarah Jane Hamilton (1842-1924) (Divorced in 1861)

Legacy
Archibald Gardner had 11 wives and 48 children. Gardner's life is memorialized by a monument in Afton, Wyoming, and a restored gristmill at Gardner Village. The site where Archibald built his original flour mill in West Jordan, Utah, is now known as Gardner Village and features a collection of other early pioneer homes that now house shops and a restaurant dedicated to him called Archibald's Restaurant. 

Leland mills, one of the last mills Gardner built when he was alive, still operates today as Leland Milling Company in Spanish Fork, Utah. 

Olympic Greco-Roman wrestling gold medalist Rulon Gardner is the great-great-grandson of Archibald Gardner.
A new headstone was dedicated for Archibald Gardner after a 1990 Afton, Wyoming, family reunion when 2,000 of his 20,000 descendants attended.

References

Further reading
 Carter, Kate B. and Daughters of Utah Pioneers. "Archibald Gardner, the Miller." Heartthrobs of the West, vol. 3, Salt Lake City, Daughters of Utah Pioneers, 1948.
 Carter, Kate B. and Daughters of Utah Pioneers. "Journal and Diary of Robert Gardner." Heartthrobs of the West, vol. 10, Salt Lake City, Daughters of Utah Pioneers, 1951.
 Dedication West Jordan Church. Deseret News, 1867-08-14.
 Furse, B. S., editor. A History of West Jordan. Salt Lake City, City of West Jordan, 1995.
 Hughes, Delilah Gardner Life of Archibald Gardner. American Fork, Alpine Publishing Company, 1939
  — covers West Jordan Mill activities in 1858

External links

 millpictures.com — Picture of Gardner Mill in West Jordan
 Rootsweb.com — Genealogy and Family info
 The Sprague Project — Family Information
  — including gravestones and obituary
 The Archibald Gardner Family blog—includes photos of Robert and Archibald's birth-home in Scotland and a map of Robert's land grant in Canada where Archibald grew up
 Archibald Gardner autobiography, MSS 537, at L. Tom Perry Special Collections Library, Brigham Young University
Transcription of above autobiography

1814 births
1902 deaths
Converts to Mormonism
Mormon pioneers
People from Kilsyth
People from West Jordan, Utah
Scottish emigrants to pre-Confederation Ontario
Scottish Latter Day Saints
Burials at Salt Lake City Cemetery
Scottish leaders of the Church of Jesus Christ of Latter-day Saints
Immigrants to Upper Canada
People from Afton, Wyoming
Harold B. Lee Library-related 19th century articles